Peter Winchester nicknamed "Chester" is an Australian former rugby league footballer who played in the 1970s.  He played for Canterbury-Bankstown in the New South Wales Rugby League (NSWRL) competition.

Background
Winchester played junior rugby league for Lewisham Old Boys.

Playing career
Winchester made his first grade debut for Canterbury-Bankstown in Round 1 1973 against Manly-Warringah.  Originally a five-eighth, Winchester moved to the centres in the 1974 season.  Winchester played at centre for Canterbury against Eastern Suburbs in the 1974 NSWRL grand final, the clubs first since the 1967 grand final defeat by South Sydney.

Easts defeated Canterbury 19-4 at the Sydney Cricket Ground to win their first premiership since 1945.  In 1975 and 1976, Winchester became a regular member of the reserve grade team and retired from playing before the start of the 1977 season.  In total, Winchester played 101 games for the club across all grades.

Post playing
Winchester later became a director of the club after the board at the time stood down due to the 2002 salary cap scandal which occurred where Canterbury were docked 37 competition points and fined $500,000 for exceeding the cap amount in 2000 and 2001.

References

Canterbury-Bankstown Bulldogs players
Australian rugby league players
Rugby league five-eighths
Rugby league centres
1949 births
Living people
Rugby league players from Sydney